Muleshoe is a city in Bailey County, Texas, United States. It was founded in 1913, when the Pecos and Northern Texas Railway built an  line from Farwell, Texas, to Lubbock through northern Bailey County. In 1926, Muleshoe was incorporated. Its population was 5,158 at the 2010 census. The county seat of Bailey County, it is home to the National Mule Memorial.

The Muleshoe Heritage Center, located off the combined U.S. Routes 70 and 84, is a popular museum that commemorates the importance of ranching to West Texas. The complex has several unique buildings originally from Bailey County that display the living conditions of the area from the late 19th to the  mid-20th centuries.

Founded in 1935, the refuge is the oldest of its kind in  Texas. It is a  wintering area for migratory waterfowl flying from Canada to Mexico. It contains the largest number of sandhill cranes in North America.

History

The name Muleshoe can be traced in the region to Henry Black, when he registered a brand on November 12, 1860. Later, he built a large ranch house and a log schoolhouse, and established a small cemetery for family members. Muleshoe Ranch was supposedly named after the owner found a mule shoe in the soil.

On April 23, 1906, the Gulf, Santa Fe and Northwestern Railway Company and the Pecos and Northern Texas Railway Company merged (eventual successor BNSF Railway) and were chartered to construct a railway between Lubbock and Farwell on the New Mexico border. From 1901 to 1915, communities along the future railway contributed hundreds of thousands of dollars to its construction. Muleshoe was founded in 1913 when the Pecos and Northern Texas Railway laid rails across northern Bailey County; residents borrowed the name from the nearby Muleshoe Ranch.

Soon after the railroad passed through Muleshoe, the town expanded rapidly. In 1917, Muleshoe became the county seat after the county was organized, but it was not incorporated until 1926. Muleshoe continued to grow quickly, and by 1930, 800 residents were in the town. Three decades later, Muleshoe had tripled in population to 3,871. In 1970, Muleshoe reached its pinnacle at over 5,000 residents, 200 businesses, two hospitals, two banks, a library, a newspaper, and a radio station. 
During the 1970s and 1980s the population stagnated, and by the 1990s Muleshoe's population had begun to decrease. The population went from 5,048 in 1988 to 4,530 in 2000. The once lively and vibrant Main Street is now quiet, with many abandoned buildings. Many of the businesses that once called Main Street home are now on American Boulevard (US Highway 84/70).

During the early 1960s, Texas residents were eager to build a memorial to the mule for its strength and sparse eating habits, traits that endeared it to the pioneers. In war, the mule carried cannon; in peace, it hauled freight. Its small hooves allowed it to scale rocky areas. The Mule Memorial was first displayed on July 4, 1965, near the intersection of US 70/84. Muleshoe is the home of the world's largest mule shoe, at the Muleshoe Heritage Center.

Geography

Muleshoe is situated on the Great Plains in an area where the plains reach their highest altitude at the foot of the Rocky Mountains known as the High Plains; more specifically, it is located on the South Plains in a region known as the Llano Estacado. The area topology is gently rolling plains with a large number of playa lakes on top of a large plateau.  Soil types vary from dark brown playa-lake silt to iron-rich clay to sandy soil; topsoil and subsoil layers vary, as well. Most of the area contains a layer of caliche; in some areas, no topsoil or subsoil reveals the layer of caliche, while other places have up to 4 ft of topsoil or subsoil combined.

Muleshoe lies over the largest aquifer in the United States, the Ogallala Aquifer. It provides all of the city's water and is essential for the agriculture for the surrounding area. The aquifer is being depleted at an increasing rate over the years; this has triggered many changes in agriculture in efforts to preserve this natural resource.

The physical characteristics of the region make Muleshoe an ideal place for agriculture, except for water. Much of the natural habitat of grasslands and shrubs has been replaced by cash crops and livestock, but a few areas of native fauna (called Conservation Reserve Program) are preserved. The refuge is a wintering area for large numbers of migratory waterfowl, such as sandhill cranes, and preserves much of the native wildlife.

Climate
Muleshoe is in an area considered part of the semiarid steppe climate zone that extends from areas of central Mexico to southern Alberta and Saskatchewan in Canada. The semiarid steppe classification identifies areas that are intermediate between desert zones and humid zones. This West Texas town experiences hot summer days and cool summer nights and cool to warm winter days and harsh, cold winter nights. High summer temperatures (average July temperature above 90 °F) precipitation moisture is rapidly lost to evaporation. Muleshoe experiences steady, and sometimes intense, winds from the north and west in the fall and winter, and winds from the south or west in the spring and summer. The winds add a considerable wind chill factor in the winter.

Shortgrass prairie, prickly pear cacti, and scrub vegetation are the most common flora to be seen around town. Agriculture in the forms of cattle ranching, dairy farming, and wheat and cotton farming are the most prevalent in the area.

Demographics

2020 census

As of the 2020 United States census, there were 5,160 people, 1,619 households, and 1,071 families residing in the city.

2010 census
As of the census of 2010, 5,158 people, 1,595 households, and 1,178 families resided in the town. The population density was 1,323.9 people per square mile (511.4/km2). The 1,802 housing units averaged 526.6 per square mile (203.4/km2). The racial makeup of the city was 63.27% White, 1.50% African American, 0.64% Native American, 0.20% Asian, 31.59% from other races, and 2.80% from two or more races. Hispanics or Latinos of any race were 53.33% of the population.

Of the 1595 households, 38.6% had children under the age of 18 living with them, 61.3% were married couples living together, 8.8% had a female householder with no husband present, and 26.1% were not families. About 24.1% of all households were made up of individuals, and 14.5% had someone living alone who was 65 years of age or older. The average household size was 2.80 and the average family size was 3.35.

In the city, the population was distributed as 31.3% under  18, 9.1% from 18 to 24, 25.1% from 25 to 44, 19.8% from 45 to 64, and 14.6% who were 65  or older. The median age was 33 years. For every 100 females, there were 92.8 males. For every 100 females age 18 and over, there were 90.8 males.

The median income for a household in the city was $25,519, and for a family was $31,969. Males had a median income of $23,409 and females a median income $16,053. The per capita income for the city was $12,567. In 2007, the median house value was $48,748, and the average house value $66,525. In 2008, the cost-of-living index in Muleshoe was 73.3 as compared to the U.S. average of 100. About 13.4% of families and 18.0% of the population were below the poverty line, including 21.9% of those under age 18 and 13.6% of those age 65 or over.

Recreation
In May 2010, Muleshoe opened a water park within the New City Park at 1611 West Avenue D. The facility has a large pool with a lazy river, diving board, and water slide. The park also offers soccer and softball fields, a playground, fishing pond, and basketball courts. City Secretary LeAnn Gallman said that the $1.8 million project originated in 2007, construction began in 2009, and was completed in 2010. The city previously had a 60-year-old pool.

Education

Muleshoe is served by the Muleshoe Independent School District. Schools include:
 Muleshoe High School (grades 9–12)
 Watson Junior High School (grades 6–8)
 Mary DeShazo Elementary School (grades 3–5)
 Neal B. Dillman Elementary School (grades Pre-K–2)

Over the past few years, the Muleshoe Independent School District has expanded all of its campuses to accommodate the growing population of school-aged children. The Muleshoe High School teams are known as the "Mules"; the school colors are black and white.

The Muleshoe Mules won the Division 1 2A football state championship for the 2008–2009 football season. This is the first title the Mules have won.

Also a branch of South Plains College provides classes for students aspiring to become licensed vocational nurses. The branch is located near the hospital.

Miscellaneous
The town is the home of the annual Tour de Muleshoe bicycle ride, a local competition which features 100K, and  bike tours every year.

Muleshoe hosts one of the USArray Transportable Array seismic stations as part of the ongoing Earthscope project.

Muleshoe is home to the world's largest mule shoe, measuring 22 feet long and 17 feet wide. It is also home to the national mule memorial, Ol' Pete, which was invited to and attended President George W. Bush's first inauguration in 2001.

Notable people

 Lee Horsley, actor, was born in Muleshoe on May 15, 1955. He played the fictional detective Matt Houston on an ABC series of the same name and later starred in the CBS Western Paradise
 Lincoln Riley, head coach of the University of Southern California football team, is a former Muleshoe High School quarterback
 Allan Weisbecker, writer and surfer, lived briefly in Muleshoe during the late 1990s
 Kevin D. Williamson, pundit and a native of the Texas Panhandle, often uses Muleshoe as a metaphor for American culture in his columns

References

External links

 City of Muleshoe
 Muleshoe Chamber of Commerce
 Handbook of Texas Online article

Cities in Bailey County, Texas
Cities in Texas
County seats in Texas
Populated places established in 1913
1913 establishments in Texas